Mu Ko Ang Thong is a marine national park in the Gulf of Thailand in Surat Thani Province. The park was established on 12 November 1980. The northern tip of Ko Phaluai is also part of the marine park. There is a ranger station, bungalows, a shop, and a restaurant at Ao Phi Beach on Ko Wua Talap.

The name "Ang Thong" (Thai: อ่างทอง) means 'bowl of gold'. "Mu Ko" (หมู่เกาะ) simply means 'group of islands'.

Since 2002 the park has been registered as Ramsar site number 1184.

Topography 
Mu Ko Ang Thong is a national park located in shallow water near the shore.

Islands

Gallery

See also
List of national parks of Thailand
List of Protected Areas Regional Offices of Thailand

References

External links

National parks of Thailand
Geography of Surat Thani province
Ramsar sites in Thailand
Protected areas established in 1980
Tourist attractions in Surat Thani province
1980 establishments in Thailand